This list of pipeline accidents in the United States provides access to links for various timeframes, which are sometimes quite extensive.

Before 1900

1900–1949

1950–1974

1975–1999
 List of pipeline accidents in the United States in 1975
 List of pipeline accidents in the United States in 1976
 List of pipeline accidents in the United States in 1977
 List of pipeline accidents in the United States in 1978
 List of pipeline accidents in the United States in 1979
 List of pipeline accidents in the United States in 1980
 List of pipeline accidents in the United States in 1981
 List of pipeline accidents in the United States in 1982
 List of pipeline accidents in the United States in 1983
 List of pipeline accidents in the United States in 1984
 List of pipeline accidents in the United States in 1985
 List of pipeline accidents in the United States in 1986
 List of pipeline accidents in the United States in 1987
 List of pipeline accidents in the United States in 1988
 List of pipeline accidents in the United States in 1989
 List of pipeline accidents in the United States in 1990
 List of pipeline accidents in the United States in 1991
 List of pipeline accidents in the United States in 1992
 List of pipeline accidents in the United States in 1993
 List of pipeline accidents in the United States in 1994
 List of pipeline accidents in the United States in 1995
 List of pipeline accidents in the United States in 1996
 List of pipeline accidents in the United States in 1997
 List of pipeline accidents in the United States in 1998
 List of pipeline accidents in the United States in 1999

2000–present 
 List of pipeline accidents in the United States in 2000
 List of pipeline accidents in the United States in 2001
 List of pipeline accidents in the United States in 2002
 List of pipeline accidents in the United States in 2003
 List of pipeline accidents in the United States in 2004
 List of pipeline accidents in the United States in 2005
 List of pipeline accidents in the United States in 2006
 List of pipeline accidents in the United States in 2007
 List of pipeline accidents in the United States in 2008
 List of pipeline accidents in the United States in 2009
 List of pipeline accidents in the United States in 2010
 List of pipeline accidents in the United States in 2011
 List of pipeline accidents in the United States in 2012
 List of pipeline accidents in the United States in 2013
 List of pipeline accidents in the United States in 2014
 List of pipeline accidents in the United States in 2015
 List of pipeline accidents in the United States in 2016
 List of pipeline accidents in the United States in 2017
 List of pipeline accidents in the United States in 2018
 List of pipeline accidents in the United States in 2019
 List of pipeline accidents in the United States in 2020
 List of pipeline accidents in the United States in 2021
 List of pipeline accidents in the United States in 2022
 List of pipeline accidents in the United States in 2023

Lists of pipeline accidents in the United States